Khakaureseneb was an ancient Egyptian mayor/governor of Bubastis (Tell Basta) in the Eastern Nile Delta, dating to the late Middle Kingdom. A squatting statue of him was found in the governoral palace at Tell Basta.

He is not to be confused with Khakaureseneb, mayor of Elephantine.

References
BaKr, Brandl, Kalloniatis (eds.), Egyptian Antiquities from the Eastern Nile Delta, 2, 24, 309–11, cat. 10
Lange-Athinodorou, Eva. (2017). Palace Cemeteries of the Eastern Delta. 10.2307/j.ctvrzgw3b.14.

Middle Kingdom of Egypt
Officials of the Twelfth Dynasty of Egypt
Nomarchs